Joel Bergvall is the Swedish-born Academy Award nominated filmmaker behind some of the biggest brand stories of the past decades. With a unique blend of Hollywood and brand experience, Bergvall is known for the short film Victor (1999), the thriller Den osynlige (2002, remade as The Invisible in 2007) and screenplay adaption of Tunnels, the British novel series by Roderick Gordon and Brian Williams, as well as some of the biggest and most shareable branded content short films of the past decade, including several featuring celebrities like Sylvester Stallone, Cristiano Ronaldo, Tim McGraw, Dua Lipa, John Cena, Ed Sheeran and many more.

Biography
Bergvall grew up in the suburbs of Stockholm. His formal education included the film program at Södra Latin Gymnasium in Stockholm, Sweden, as well as Kulturama's program for film studies, also in Stockholm.

Bergvall had a meteoric career in documentary work in his late teens and early 20s, starting in television news and documentary work, working professionally as a cinematographer and editor, even before graduating high school. After freelancing for local and national TV networks, he transitioned to international work as a documentary filmmaker and producer, working on assignment from numerous European networks in Israel, the Palestinian territories, Pakistan, Afghanistan, Bosnia, Croatia, and other global hotspots.

Bergvall followed this documentary stint with more scripted television work, earning him numerous awards in Guldklappan, Sweden's highest award for media productions.

Bergvall then partnered with Simon Sandquist to produce and direct the short film Victor, earning him an Academy Award nomination. It also caused him to meet his wife, as she broke into the Academy Awards.

Bergvall and Sandquist partnered again, to direct the theatrical feature Den Osynlige (a.k.a. The Invisible). After an award winning international reception, it was sold to Spyglass and, in partnership with Disney, became the first film in a wave of English-language remakes of Swedish films, The Invisible.

Bergvall since worked on several projects at various Hollywood studios, including Fear Itself at Intermedia, Books of Magic at Warner Brothers, The Imagined at Fox, Trap Door at New Line Cinema, and more.

Bergvall's first English language feature was Possession (a.k.a. Addicted), produced by Vertigo and Spitfire Entertainment, released by Yari Film Group and 20th Century Fox, and starring Sarah Michelle Gellar.

As a writer, Bergvall also adapted, with Sandquist, the British novel series Tunnels by Roderick Gordon and Brian Williams for Relativity. He also partnered with Converge Studios to produce Ballerz, a scripted lifestyle show based on the life of NBA superstar Shaquille O'Neal, and Fly or Die, a New Media TV show inspired by the real-life music duo Rock Mafia, initially released through BitTorrent.

With the rise of digital media, Bergvall specialized in highly shareable branded content, directing and producing some of the biggest hits in the world over the last few years, working with celebrities like Sylvester Stallone, Cristiano Ronaldo, Tim McGraw, Dua Lipa, John Cena, Ed Sheeran and many more.

Bergvall is currently a Partner and Chief Story Officer with Shareability.

References

External links 

An interview with Joel Bergvall at Authority Magazine

1973 births
Living people
Swedish film directors